Lisa Endlich, also known as Lisa Heffernan, is a business writer and former vice-president at Goldman Sachs. She has an MBA from the MIT Sloan School of Management and worked as a trader at Goldman Sachs from 1985 to 1989.

Bibliography

External links
BusinessWeek Exclusive: A Chat about Goldman Sachs with Author Lisa Endlich
BusinessWeek: How Greed Changed Goldman
Lisa Endlich quotes

MIT Sloan School of Management alumni
Year of birth missing (living people)
Living people
American economics writers
American business writers
Women business writers
20th-century American women writers
20th-century American non-fiction writers
21st-century American women writers
American women non-fiction writers
21st-century American non-fiction writers